Robert Taylor (1835 – 30 October 1901) was a New Zealand cricketer who played two matches of first-class cricket for Canterbury in 1864 and 1869. He bowled the first delivery in New Zealand first-class cricket.

Taylor opened the bowling for Canterbury in the match against Otago in January 1864 that is now recognised as the first first-class match in New Zealand. He took 6 for 21 in the first innings and 2 for 23 in the second, but Canterbury nevertheless lost by 78 runs.

He died at his home in the small town of Sefton, north of Christchurch, on 30 October 1901, survived by his wife Jeanie.

References

1835 births
1901 deaths
New Zealand cricketers
Canterbury cricketers